"China" is a song by Puerto Rican rappers Anuel AA and Daddy Yankee and Colombian singer Karol G with Puerto Rican singer Ozuna and Colombian singer J Balvin from Anuel AA's second studio album Emmanuel. The single was released through Anuel AA's label Real Hasta la Muerte on July 19, 2019, alongside a music video directed by Marlon Peña. "China" samples the 2000 song "It Wasn't Me" by Jamaican musician Shaggy, which itself samples War’s “Smile Happy” hence both Shaggy and the members of War (despite the latter's song never appearing on the track) are credited as songwriters for this song. It was also written by Anuel AA, Daddy Yankee, Karol G, Ozuna, and J Balvin, and was produced by Puerto Rican record producer Tainy.

It has been described as a reggaeton song with lyrics about infidelity at a nightclub and getting caught red-handed. Commercially, the song peaked at number one in Argentina, Bolivia, Colombia, Mexico, Peru and Spain and reached the top 10 in nine other countries. In the United States, it has topped the Billboard Hot Latin Songs chart and peaked at number 43 on the Billboard Hot 100. In Europe, the single ranked within the top 15 in Switzerland and Italy. In 2020, "China" received Latin Grammy nominations for Record of the Year and Best Urban Fusion Performance. The song is also part of Just Dance 2022.

Background 
"China" was written by Anuel AA, Daddy Yankee, Karol G, Ozuna, and J Balvin, and was produced by Puerto Rican Latin Grammy Award-winner record producer Tainy. Tainy had previously worked with Anuel AA on "Sola" (2016), with Daddy Yankee on "Noche de Entiero" (2006), "Bella y Sensual" and "Si Supieras" (2019), with Karol G on "Mi Mala" (2017), with Ozuna on "No Quiero Amores" (2017), and with J Balvin on the majority of his albums Vibras (2018) and Oasis (2019). He had also co-produced the Grammy Award-nominated song "I Like It" (2018) by Cardi B, Bad Bunny, and J Balvin.

Anuel AA told Billboard in July 2019 that he "had been looking to revive a classic" and chose Shaggy's "It Wasn't Me" because it "hit" him. He started listening to old songs and remembered Shaggy's track from his childhood. He told XXL that "when [he] used to go with the big boys in [his] hood to the club, they put that song on and everybody used to go crazy". He chose to redo "It Wasn't Me" and supposed that there would not be any problems with the release due to Shaggy's collaborations with Hispanic artists. He recorded the song and sent the mix to Daddy Yankee, who "went crazy about it" and finished recording his verse in three days. Anuel AA then showed it to his girlfriend Karol G at their home and she opined that it was "the best track [she has] heard from [him]". He wanted her on the record because she liked it and "[they] always help each other" and started to think about "classics that had all the big names in them".

After some time, he met Ozuna and showed the song to him, who "went crazy as well" and recorded his part. J Balvin was the last one to record, as the original collaboration did not include him, according to Anuel AA's announcement in April 2019. Balvin's participation was revealed by Billboard two months later. Anuel AA has stated that it is "the strongest song of [his] career up to date". He referred to the track as a "mix of different cultures with each of the collaborators contributing with its own flow". The song's title comes from the "strong Chinese elements" on Shaggy's "It Wasn't Me".

Composition 
"China" has been referred to as a reggaeton song with a length of five minutes and one second. It samples and is a Spanish-language adaptation of Jamaican singer Shaggy's 2000 single "It Wasn't Me". Much like "It Wasn't Me", the lyrics to "China" speak of infidelity and getting caught red-handed. Jessica Roiz of Billboard wrote that the song is about "meeting someone at the club, having a good time and forgetting about their significant other". In addition to the song's sample, the song also interpolates lyrics from Daddy Yankee's 2007 single "Ella Me Levantó". Billboards Leila Cobo described the song as a "reggaeton explosion", while Jessica Roiz referred to it as "a fun Latin urban-meets-EDM" and a "Latin-EDM twist" to Shaggy's "It Wasn't Me". Suzy Exposito of Rolling Stone described it as "an EDM-reggaeton rework of Shaggy's 2000 cheaters' anthem".

Release and reception 
"China" was made available for digital download and online streaming on July 19, 2019, by Anuel AA's record label Real Hasta la Muerte. Leila Cobo of Billboard wrote that the song "is the trap star's ultimate redemption" which "allows each artist to shine in an eminently danceable and commercially proven track that stays true to the original while managing to be completely refreshing". Suzy Exposito of Rolling Stone stated that Anuel AA "strikes gold" with the song. Raúl Gillén of Spanish music website Jenesaispop praised the chorus and "that strident 'Mi Gente'-style trumpet that has been exploited so much in recent years". He also wrote that the song could become reggaeton's summer hit in Spain due to the performers' fame and its "undeniable magnetism".

In order to promote the song, Anuel AA encouraged people on social media to take part of the China Challenge, which consists of uploading a video dancing to the song, imitating the movements of a person in a wheelchair. Editors of Spanish newspapers Okdiario and La Vanguardia found the challenge inappropriate, disrespectful and offensive. Colombian newspaper El Universal reported that numerous Instagram users criticized it for being "a mockery to people in wheelchairs". Anuel AA explained that the dance move was based on a scene from Walt Disney Productions' 1940 film Pinocchio.

Commercial performance 
In the United States, "China" debuted at number two on Billboards Hot Latin Songs chart on the issue dated August 3, 2019, and topped both the Latin Digital Songs and Latin Streaming Songs charts with 1,000 downloads sold and 14.1 million streams. The single subsequently peaked at number one on the week ending August 17, 2019, becoming Anuel AA's third number-one and 10th top 10 on Hot Latin Songs, as well as his highest-charting single as a lead artist on the list. The track also garnered Daddy Yankee his seventh number-one and 29th top 10 on Hot Latin Songs, tying with Chayanne, Cristian Castro and Shakira as the third artist with most top 10s on the chart since its inception in 1986. It also became J Balvin's sixth number-one song, Ozuna's fourth, and Karol G's first.

On the US Billboard Hot 100, the song debuted at number 52 on the week ending August 3, 2019, becoming Anuel AA's sixth entry and his third highest-ranking title on the chart, as well as Karol G's highest. It subsequently peaked at number 43 on August 17, 2019, becoming Daddy Yankee's seventh top 50 song on the Hot 100, as well as J Balvin's fifth, Ozuna's fourth, Anuel AA's third, and Karol G's first. It has also peaked at number 27 on Streaming Songs and at number 38 on Digital Songs. "China" has also reached number 37 on the Rolling Stone Top 100 Songs chart on the week ending August 8, 2019 with 52,600 sales plus track-equivalent streams.

Internationally, the song peaked at number one in Argentina, Bolivia, Colombia, Mexico, Peru and Spain and reached the top 10 in Chile, Ecuador, El Salvador, Honduras, Nicaragua, Panama, Paraguay, Puerto Rico, and Venezuela. Across Europe, it has also peaked at number 11 in Switzerland, number 15 in Italy, and number 39 in Sweden. The track also became both Anuel AA's and Karol G's highest-charting song in Switzerland, Sweden, and the Netherlands. "China" was also the second most-played radio song in Latin America on the week ending August 4, 2019, with 6,797 spins across the 19 countries Monitor Latino measures.

Music video 
The music video for "China" was directed by Dominican filmmaker and director Marlon Peña, who had previously worked with Anuel AA on "Controla" (2019), with Daddy Yankee on eight clips including "Mayor Que Yo" (2005), "Shaky Shaky" (2016) and "Con Calma" (2019), and with both of them on "Adictiva" (2018) and the remix version of "Asesina" (2018), in which Ozuna also performs. J Balvin filmed separately, since he was the last one to record and the music video had been already shot in April 2019. The official music video on YouTube was released on Anuel AA's channel on July 19, 2019. It has received over 1.4 billion views as of July 2020.

Charts

Weekly charts

Year-end charts

Certifications

See also 
 List of Billboard Hot Latin Songs and Latin Airplay number ones of 2019

References 

2019 songs
2019 singles
Anuel AA songs
Daddy Yankee songs
J Balvin songs
Karol G songs
Number-one singles in Spain
Argentina Hot 100 number-one singles
Ozuna (singer) songs
Spanish-language songs
Songs written by Anuel AA
Songs written by J Balvin
Songs written by Daddy Yankee
Songs written by Ozuna (singer)
Songs written by Karol G
Song recordings produced by Tainy
Moombahton songs